Tare or Tares may refer to:

 Tare (armour), a leg and groin protector used in a number of Japanese martial arts
 Tare (surname), a surname
 Tare (tufted grass), a genus of nine species of tufted grasses
 Tare, Rwanda
 Tare River, in Romania
 Tare sauce, a Japanese dipping sauce
 Tare weight, the weight of an empty vehicle or container
 Tares, Iran
 Vicia sativa, a plant also known as the tare
 Parable of the Tares, a parable of Jesus